Johannes Thedens (1680 – 19 March 1748) was Governor-General of the Dutch East Indies from 6 November 1741 until 28 May 1743.

Thedens, born in a largely Dutch settlement in Friedrichstadt, Schleswig, sailed on 17 December 1697 as a soldier aboard the Unie to the Dutch East Indies. In 1702 he was appointed to the post of 'Assistant' in the Dutch East India Company and in 1719, to 'Buyer' (koopman). He then progressed (between 1723 and 1725) up through the ranks to 'Chief Buyer' (opperkoopman) then 'Head of Post' (opperhoofd) at Deshima in Japan.

In 1731, he was co-opted to the Council of the Indies and in 1736, he was made a full member (Raad-ordinair of Indie). In 1740 he was appointed by the Directors as a 'First Councillor and Director General' of the Indies. On 6 November 1741, following the dismissal of Adriaan Valckenier (whom he had arrested and placed in prison in the castle at Batavia), he became 'interim' Governor General. He continued in office up to 28 May 1743, and was able to overcome the Chinese insurrection and put the sugar trade on a better footing. He was succeeded by Gustaaf Willem baron van Imhoff.  He died in Batavia

See also
 VOC Opperhoofden in Japan

Notes

References
 . (1963). Historical documents relating to Japan in foreign countries: an inventory of microfilm acquisitions in the library of the Historiographical Institute, the University of Tokyo. OCLC 450710
 Paulus, J., Graaff, S. d., Stibbe, D. G., Spat, C., Stroomberg, J., & Sandbergen, F. J. W. H. (1917). Encyclopaedie van Nederlandsch-Indië. 's-Gravenhage: M. Nijhoff
 Putten, L.P. van, 2002 Ambitie en onvermogen : gouverneurs-generaal van Nederlands-Indië 1610-1796.

External links
 Voc 
 

1680 births
1748 deaths
18th-century Dutch people
Governors-General of the Dutch East Indies
18th-century Dutch colonial governors
Dutch chiefs of factory in Japan
People from Friedrichstadt